Yoko Hunnicutt, née Ota (born 14 January 1975 in Amagasaki, Hyōgo and raised in Kamakura, Kanagawa) is a Japanese high jumper. Her personal best jump is 1.95 metres, achieved in July 2002 in Sapporo.

She finished fifth at the 1992 World Junior Championships and eleventh at the 2000 Olympics. At the regional level she won the 1991 Asian Championships and the 1998 Asian Games and finished second at the 1998 Asian Championships.

Achievements

References

Profile 

1975 births
Living people
People from Amagasaki
People from Kamakura
Sportspeople from Kanagawa Prefecture
Sportspeople from Hyōgo Prefecture
Japanese female high jumpers
Olympic female high jumpers
Olympic athletes of Japan
Athletes (track and field) at the 2000 Summer Olympics
Asian Games gold medalists for Japan
Asian Games medalists in athletics (track and field)
Athletes (track and field) at the 1998 Asian Games
Athletes (track and field) at the 2002 Asian Games
Medalists at the 1998 Asian Games
Competitors at the 1995 Summer Universiade
World Athletics Championships athletes for Japan
Japan Championships in Athletics winners
20th-century Japanese women
21st-century Japanese women